Brief is an unincorporated community in Union County, North Carolina, United States. Brief is located just north of the  town of Fairview.

References

Unincorporated communities in Union County, North Carolina
Unincorporated communities in North Carolina